Thermorthemis madagascariensis or Madagascar Jungle Skimmer is a species of dragonfly in the genus Thermorthemis endemic to Madagascar. It is the largest dragonfly on the island of Madagascar

References

External links

Odonata of Africa
Libellulidae